Black gooseberry can refer to:

Ribes divaricatum, coast black gooseberry
Ribes lacustre, bristly black gooseberry
Ribes oxyacanthoides ssp. irriguum, inland black gooseberry

See also
Black currant (disambiguation)
Jostaberry, a black currant—gooseberry hybrid